Athletics competitions at the 2022 South American Games in Asunción, Paraguay will be held from 12 to 15 October 2022 at the Athletics National Center in the Parque Olímpico cluster in Luque, a sub-venue outside Asunción, with the marathon and 35 km racewalks being held at Costanera José Asunción Flores.

Forty nine medal events are scheduled to be contested; 48 events equally divided among men and women plus a 4 × 400 metres relay mixed event. A total of 324 athletes will compete in the events. The events were open competitions without age restrictions.

Athletes who achieve the gold medal in each event will qualify for the 2023 Pan American Games, with the qualification quotas going to the athletes and not their NOCs.

Brazil are the athletics competitions defending champions having won them in the previous edition in Cochabamba 2018.

Participating nations
A total of 13 nations registered athletes for the athletics competitions. Each nation was able to enter a maximum of 85 athletes; up to 2 men and 2 women for the individual events and one team for each relay event:

Venues
The athletics competitions were held in two venues. Road events (marathons and 35 km racewalks) will take place at Costanera José Asunción Flores in Asunción, while track and field events (including 20 km racewalks) will be held at Athletics National Center located within the Parque Olímpico in Luque. The athletic track has a certificate of the World Athletics.

Medal summary

Medal table

Medalists

Men's events

Women's events

Mixed event

References

External links
ASU2022 Athletics
Results
Results book

 
2022 South American Games events
2022
South American Games
2022